Kamienica is a village in the administrative district of Gmina Stronie Śląskie, within Kłodzko County, Lower Silesian Voivodeship, in south-western Poland.

The village has a population of 56.

Villages in Kłodzko County